Breweries in Kentucky produce a wide range of beers in different styles that are marketed locally and regionally. Brewing companies vary widely in the volume and variety of beer produced,  from small nanobreweries to microbreweries to massive multinational conglomerate macrobreweries.

In 2012 Kentucky's 21 breweries and brewpubs employed 270 people directly, and more than 8,000 others in related jobs such as wholesaling and retailing. Including people directly employed in brewing, as well as those who supply Kentucky's breweries with everything from ingredients to machinery, the total business and personal tax revenue generated by Kentucky's breweries and related industries was more than $167 million. Consumer purchases of Kentucky's brewery products generated more than $160 million in additional tax revenue. In 2012, according to the Brewers Association, Kentucky ranked 43rd in the number of craft breweries per capita with 14.

For context, at the end of 2013 there were 2,822 breweries in the United States, including 2,768 craft breweries subdivided into 1,237 brewpubs, 1,412 microbreweries and 119 regional craft breweries.  In that same year, according to the Beer Institute, the brewing industry employed around 43,000 Americans in brewing and distribution and had a combined economic impact of more than $246 billion.

Breweries

Active Breweries
 3rd Turn Brewing - Jeffersontown/Crestwood
 Abettor Brewing Company - Winchester
 Against the Grain Brewery - Louisville
 Akasha Brewing Company - Louisville
 Alexandria Brewing Company - Alexandria
 Apocalypse Brew Works - Louisville
 Blue Stallion Brewing - Lexington
 Bluegrass Brewing Company - Louisville
 Braxton Brewing Company - Covington/Bellevue/Fort Mitchell
 Country Boy Brewing -  Lexington/Georgetown
 The Dam Brewhaus - Benton 
 Darkness Brewing - Bellevue
 Dry Ground Brewing Company - Paducah 
 Ethereal Brewing - Lexington 
 Falls City Brewery - Louisville
 Great Flood Brewing Co. - Louisville/Middletown 
 Hop Hound Brew Pub - Murray
 Jarfly Brewing Company - Somerset
 Lexington Brewing and Distilling Company - Lexington
 Mash Cult Brewing - Florence
 Mile Wide Beer Co. - Louisville
 Paducah Beer Werks - Paducah
 Shippingport Brewing - Louisville
 Tap on Main Brewing - Somerset
 West Sixth Brewing - Lexington/Frankfort/Louisville
 Wooden Cask Brewing Company  - Newport
 Yancey's Gastropub & Brewery  - Glasgow

Defunct Breweries
Oldenberg Brewery, a defunct brewery and pub in Fort Mitchell, Kentucky  and The American Museum of Brewing Arts part of a Greater Cincinnati tourist expansion.
 White Squirrel Brewery - Bowling Green

See also
 Beer in the United States
 List of breweries in the United States
 List of defunct breweries in the United States
 List of microbreweries

References

Notes

Citations
 

Kentucky
Lists of companies based in Kentucky
Breweries